The Etelsen Tierpark was a small zoo in the castle park of  in Etelsen, Langwedel, Verden, Niedersachsen, Germany.

The Zoo and a restaurant was founded in 1959 on the  park. The first lions were housed in the Mausoleum.

At least 4 elephants were kept in the Zoo, and one died there. The elephants were walked through Etelsen for delivery in the Zoo.

The Zoo was closed in 1965.

See also 
 List of zoos in Germany

References

External links

 
 Picture of the elephants walking through the village
 French Zoo list

Zoos in Germany
Zoos established in 1959
Zoological Garden
Zoological Garden